Washington, D.C. has the potential to install 2,100 MW of rooftop photovoltaic solar power using technology available in 2012, which would generate 21% of the electricity used in 2010.

Every two years a Solar Decathlon is held on the National Mall. Contestants are challenged to build an energy efficient building that is capable of generating all of the energy used. In 2013 the Solar Decathlon was held outside Washington, D.C. for the first time, and was located in Orange County.

The District of Columbia has a renewable portfolio standard of 100% renewable energy by 2032, with a carve-out for 10% of local solar power by 2041.

There are 219 community solar facilities as of the end of 2021.

The Mount Pleasant Solar Cooperative and DC SUN
In 2006 Mount Pleasant residents Anya Schoolman and George Musser's sons Walter and Diego had watched Al Gore's documentary, An Inconvenient Truth and suggested that their families do something about the climate change problem. Upon investigating the possibility of going solar, Schoolman found the problems of building code, financial and contracting issues too complex to be solved by a single person, so Schoolman, Musser and their two sons formed the Mount Pleasant Solar Cooperative to bring greater time, expertise, lobbying and buying power to the problem. In 2009 45 houses in Mount Pleasant went solar. Since then that number has grown to about 250. Soon a Capitol Hill Solar Co-op was calling seeking Mount Pleasant's expertise. Eventually there were solar coops in every ward in the District.  In 2010 the eleven neighborhood solar coops of Washington, DC formed an umbrella organization, DC Solar United Neighborhoods (DC SUN). The SUN model has begun spreading to additional states, including Maryland and Virginia. In 2011, Schoolman founded the Solar United Neighbors (then called Community Power Network), a nonprofit organization bringing together the efforts of local renewable energy groups. As of May 2019, Solar United Neighbors is active in 12 U.S States.

Anya Schoolman and the Mount Pleasant Solar Cooperative were the subject of a segment in M. Sanjayan's Discovery Channel series Powering The Future and have been recognized by the White House's Champions of Change program.

Availability
Insolation is good at about 4.7 sun hours/day.

Installed capacity

See also

Solar power in the United States
Renewable energy in the United States

References

External links

Solar United Neighbors of D.C.
Washington DC Solar - Solar Energy Industries Association
Incentives and Policies
DC Solar Map by Mapdwell
Solar Permitting Guidelines from DCRA

Solar power in the United States
Energy in Washington, D.C.